FHCHS may refer to:
Florida Hospital College of Health Sciences
Forest Hill Community High School